Sunrise University is an Indian private university located in Alwar, Rajasthan. Spread over 30 acre campus, the university was established under Sunrise University Act, 2011 by Government of Rajasthan, and is recognised by UGC.

Sunrise University provides several diploma, undergraduate, postgraduate courses in the field of science, engineering, law studies, health, computer science and applications, commerce and agriculture.

References

External links

Private universities in India
Educational institutions established in 2011
2011 establishments in Rajasthan
Universities and colleges in Alwar
Universities in Rajasthan